Pseudococculina is a genus of sea snails, marine gastropod mollusks in the family Pseudococculinidae.

Description
The white shell has a patelliform shape with a posterior, inclined apex and a compressed, subspiral nucleus. Inside it has a porcellaneous, muscle-scar horseshoe-shaped, interrupted over the head.

The animal has a plumate gill, at the right side of the head. The right tentacle is thickened. There are two epipodial (i.e. situated in the lateral grooves between foot and mantle) filaments at the posterior part of the foot. The radula has large rhachidian teeth, with the cusp wanting or very obsolete. The fïrst lateral teeth are triangular, followed by 3 smaller, contorted laterals, with distinct
cusps, a large cusped fifth lateral, and numerous uncini.

Species
Species within the genus Pseudococculina include:
 Pseudococculina granulata Schepman, 1908
 Pseudococculina gregaria B.A. Marshall, 1986
 Pseudococculina rimula Simone & Cunha, 2003
 Pseudococculina rosea Habe, 1952
 Pseudococculina rugosoplicata Schepman, 1908
 Pseudococculina subcingulata (Kuroda & Habe, 1949)
Species brought into synonymy
 Pseudococculina concentrica Thiele, 1909: synonym of Amphiplica concentrica (Thiele, 1909)
 Pseudococculina gradata B.A. Marshall, 1986: synonym of Copulabyssia gradata (B. A. Marshall, 1986)

References

 Higo, S., Callomon, P. & Goto, Y. (2001) Catalogue and Bibliography of the Marine Shell-Bearing Mollusca of Japan. Gastropoda Bivalvia Polyplacophora Scaphopoda Type Figures. Elle Scientific Publications, Yao, Japan, 208 pp.

External links
 Schepman M.M. (1908). The Prosobranchia of the Siboga Expedition. Part I. Rhipidoglossa and Docoglossa. Siboga Expeditie, 49a: 1-107, pl. 1-9. Leiden, E. J. Brill

Pseudococculinidae